Denis Konstantinovich Boyarintsev (born 6 February 1978) is a Russian football coach and a former player who played as a winger. He is the manager of Novosibirsk. He was known for his ball control abilities and his hard work.

Playing career
In January 2010 FC Saturn Moscow Oblast signed the winger from Spartak Moscow.

Career stats

International career
Boyarintsev has also played for the Russian national team.

Russian national football team

Coaching career
Under his management, Tekstilshchik Ivanovo advanced to the second-tier Russian Football National League at the end of the 2018–19 season. However, the club suffered poor results in the FNL and Boyarintsev was fired on 18 December 2019.

On 30 May 2022, FC Rodina Moscow which he managed secured promotion to FNL.

Honours

Individual
 Russian Professional Football League Zone West best coach (2018–19).

References

External links
 Profile 

1978 births
Living people
Russian footballers
Russian football managers
FC Shinnik Yaroslavl players
FC Rubin Kazan players
FC Spartak Moscow players
Russia international footballers
Association football wingers
Russian Premier League players
FC Saturn Ramenskoye players
FC Zhemchuzhina Sochi players
FC Tom Tomsk players
FC Torpedo Moscow players
Footballers from Moscow
FC Nosta Novotroitsk players